Brucella oryzae is an endophytic bacterial species. It is non-pigmented, motile and Gram-negative, with type strain MTCC 4195T (=DSM 17471T).

References

Further reading

Tambekar, D. H., and P. V. Gadakh. "Biochemical and molecular detection of biosurfactant producing bacteria from soil." Int. J. LifeSci Biotechnol Pharm. Res 2 (2013): 204–211.

External links 

LPSN
Type strain of Ochrobactrum oryzae at BacDive -  the Bacterial Diversity Metadatabase

Hyphomicrobiales
Bacteria described in 2006